Letra may refer to:

 Létra, a commune in Rhône, France
 Letra (music genre), a North American folk music tradition